Seychelles has reached the epidemiological shift from communicable to noncommunicable diseases. Most communicable and infectious diseases have been controlled or eradicated.  In 2014 the World Health Organization reported that the country was on target to achieve the Millennium Development Goals and had addressed some of the social determinants of health.

Life expectancy 
The following demographic statistics are from the CIA World Factbook:

The infant mortality rate was 15.53 deaths per 1,000 live births in 2005

Healthcare
There is free access to primary healthcare for all citizens but to access tertiary health services people travel to Kenya or South Africa and pay. There are specialized services on Mahé. There are some small private medical clinics on Mahé.

In 2014 there was about one doctor per 780 people and one nurse for 400 people.

Hospitals

There was in 2019 one hospital and 17 Health Centers in the Seychelles.

References